Hildrus Augustus "Gus" Poindexter (May 10, 1901 – April 21, 1987) was an American bacteriologist who studied the epidemiology of tropical diseases. Poindexter was the third son and sixth child of eleven children born from the legal Christian marital union of Fred Poindexter, born enslaved in Kentucky, and Luvenia Gilbert, born free in Virginia. (1,2)  His father was a tenant farmer and along with his siblings, he grew up learning and tending to farming tasks.

Education 
He attended Lincoln University, graduating in 1924. A year later he attended Dartmouth Medical School and then went on to Harvard Medical School  where earned his M.D. in 1929. He furthered his studies at Columbia University, where he received an A.M. in microbiology in 1930, and the Ph.D. in microbiology and immunology in 1932. The M.A. thesis was "An Academic Study of Entamoeba histolytica" and his Ph.D. thesis was "Observations on the Defense mechanism in Trypanosoma equiperdum and T. lewisi Infections in Guinea Pigs and Rats." He received an M.S.P.H. in public health and tropical medicine from Harvard in 1932. His thesis for this degree was "Consideration of Four Major Handicaps to Normal Growth and Development of the Rural Negro Child of Certain Southern States."

Career
Poindexter joined the Howard University Medical College at Howard University in 1931 as assistant professor of microbiology in the Department of Bacteriology, Preventive Medicine and Public Health.  In 1936, he was promoted to Professor and Chair of the Department. 
He entered the United States Army in 1943 and had a very distinguished career as an expert on Malaria and other tropical diseases. He left the army as a lieutenant colonel having earned a bronze star for his work in reducing malaria infections among the troops. He continued his military service as a commissioned officer in the United States Public Health Service. In 1947, Senior Surgeon Poindexter was appointed posted to the Mission to Liberia as chief of laboratory and medical research in West Africa. The goal of the mission was to help the Liberian government in sanitation planning and the control of infectious diseases. He became director in 1948.
In 1953 Dr. Poindexter was transferred to Indochina. He went on to serve in various other countries including Vietnam, Suriname, Iraq, Libya, and Sierra Leone before returning to the faculty of Howard University. During his tenure at Howard, Pondexter mentored a number of notable younger scientists, such as Jane Hinton, the co-developer of the Mueller-Hinton agar, and Ruth Ella Moore.
Poindexter published his autobiography, My World Of Reality, in 1973 in which he candidly discusses his various life experiences including dealings with racial prejudice. One example is the offer of membership by the American Society of Parasitologists, withdrawn when the society learned that Poindexter was Black.

Memberships 
He was a Prince Hall Mason, a member of the American Society of Microbiology and a member of Omega Psi Phi fraternity.

Awards and honors 
During his military career, the Bronze Star was awarded in 1944  and he was the recipient of 4 major Combat Stars.  In 1962, Poindexter became the first known Black scientist to become board-certified in microbiology by the American Board of Medical Microbiology and was the 141st person to pass the certification exam.  This certification conferred him the honor of Diplomate of the ABMM.  Poindexter received 4 honorary Doctor of Science degrees from the following academic institutions: Lincoln University (1946), Dartmouth College (1956), Howard University (1971) and the University of Port Harcourt, Nigeria (1982).

References

Further reading
 Kessler, J., Kidd, J. Kidd R. & Morin, K. (1996). Distinguished African American Scientists of the 20th Century. Phoenix, AZ: Oryx Press. pp. 275–280.

1901 births
1987 deaths
American public health doctors
Lincoln University (Pennsylvania) alumni
Harvard Medical School alumni
Malariologists
African-American scientists
American scientists
African-American writers
American writers
Academics from Tennessee
Howard University faculty
Columbia University alumni
American Prince Hall Freemasons
20th-century African-American people